Sulphur Springs is a census-designated place (CDP) in eastern Liberty Township, Crawford County, Ohio, United States. As of the 2010 census it had a population of 194. It has a post office with the ZIP code 44881.  It is located along State Route 98 northeast of the city of Bucyrus, the county seat of Crawford County.

History
A former variant name was Annapolis. A post office called Sulphur Springs has been in operation since 1846. The community was named for a sulphur mineral springs near the original town site.

References

Census-designated places in Crawford County, Ohio